Cargo 200 is a Russian neo-noir thriller film from 2007 by Aleksei Balabanov depicting the late Soviet society. The action is set during the culmination of the Soviet–Afghan War in 1984. The movie's title Cargo 200 refers to the zinc coffins in which dead Soviet soldiers were shipped home. The movie was said to be based on a true story. It received generally positive reviews from critics.

The movie is based on William Faulkner's novel Sanctuary. In addition, a caption appears at its beginning stating that the film is based on real events. Balabanov said he had included stories told to him by various people.

Plot
Artyom (Leonid Gromov), a professor of Scientific Atheism at the Leningrad State University, is visiting his brother in a small town of Leninsk. There he is introduced to his niece's boyfriend Valery (Leonid Bichevin). Valery and Artyom's niece go off to a party, while Artyom starts on his way back to Leningrad. On the outskirts of town Artyom's car breaks down, forcing him to go to an isolated farmhouse to try to get help. There he meets the farmhouse owner Alexey (Aleksei Serebryakov), Alexey's wife Antonina (Natalya Akimova), a Vietnamese worker who goes by the name "Sunka" (Mikhail Skryabin), and a stranger who is not explained at the time. Artyom and Alexey consume large quantities of moonshine alcohol while arguing about faith in God and retribution from sins, the professor defending the Soviet atheist worldview. Vietnamese worker Sunka, who seems to be practically a personal slave of Alexey's, fixes Artyom's car and the professor drives on. However, realizing how drunk he is, Artyom decides to go back to his brother's house.

The movie switches to Valery. It turns out that Artyom's niece did not go to the party, so Valery went to a concert by himself.  At the concert Valery hangs out with Angelika (Agniya Kuznetsova), another female student friend of his who is a daughter of a high-ranking Communist Party official. They get drunk together, and after the party is over Valery drives with her to a farm of moonshiners in search of more alcohol. 

The moonshiner turns out to be the same Alexey whom Artyom had encounter earlier. Valery tells Angelika to stay in the car while he gets the alcohol. However, instead of returning directly to the car, he gets drunk senseless with the moonshiner, Alexey. Angelika, waiting in the car, notices that she is being watched by a strange man. She gets scared, and tries to get help from the moonshiner's wife Antonina. Antonina hands the girl a shotgun and hides her in a barn. The stranger enters the barn, declares that he is a police officer Captain Zhurov (Aleksei Poluyan), and takes away the gun. When Sunka tries to defend the girl, captain Zhurov murders him, then rapes the girl with a glass bottle (it appears that he himself is impotent). In the morning he handcuffs her, puts her on a police motorcycle, and takes her to his apartment where he lives with his deranged alcoholic mother. Zhurov handcuffs Angelika to the bed frame in his bedroom, and start to bring jail inmates in to rape her as he himself watches. When he decides that one of the criminals fails to "please" the girl he kills him. The girl threatens that her fiancé, who is an army paratrooper, will save her. Captain Zhurov finds out, however, that her fiance had just been killed in Afghanistan. He arranges to have the zinc-lined coffin shipped to his apartment where he opens it and throws the corpse on the bed next to the screaming girl.

Alexey the moonshiner is arrested for the murder of his worker Sunka. Captain Zhurov visits Alexey in his cell and convinces him to take the blame for the crime in return for some unexplained earlier favors. Alexey gets a visit from his wife Antonina and tells her not to worry. Antonina meets Artyom, the professor whose testimony might exonerate her husband, but Artyom refuses to testify since that would jeopardize his academic career. Alexey is convicted, sentenced to the death penalty, and summarily executed. Antonina takes the shotgun and goes to Zhurov's apartment, where she encounters Angelika still chained to the bed next to the rotting corpses. She shoots and kills Zhurov, then walks out without attempting to help the screaming girl.
 
Artyom enters a church and asks to be baptized. In the last scenes Valery, who managed to keep a low profile through the entire affair, is shown discussing business propositions with Artyom's son, Slava. The two are excited about the amount of money that can be made in the disintegrating country.

Filming 
Filming was carried out in Cherepovets, Novaya Ladoga, Staraya Ladoga, Vyborg and Pskov

Soundtrack 

 «Ariel» — In the land of magnolias
 «Zemlyane» — Grass by the Home
 «DK » — New turn
 «Kola Beldy» — I'll take you to the tundra
 «Afric Simone» — Hafanana
 «Pesniary» — Vologda
 «Kino» — There is time, but no money
 «Yuri Loza» — Raft

Reception 

Cargo 200 has an approval rating of 81% on review aggregator website Rotten Tomatoes, based on 21 reviews, and an average rating of 6.75/10.

Wally Hammond from Time Out gave the film a mostly positive review, stating, "Whether this superbly-acted, finely-directed, vision of hell is intended as a despairing state-of-the-nation address or a shocking spiritual wake-up call is unclear; what is certain, it certainly  provides this year's grizzliest cinematic ghost-ride". Vadim Rizov from Village Voice gave the film a positive review, praising the film's direction, performances, and its ability to hold its tension throughout its running time, calling it, "an unflinching portrait of the grim vileness of Soviet Russia in 1984". According to David Auerbach, the film is not a true story as claimed, but is based on William Faulkner's novel Sanctuary, which was set in Mississippi in 1929.

Awards
Won:
 2007 - Gijón International Film Festival for Best Director (Aleksey Balabanov)
 2008 - Rotterdam International Film Festival: KNF Award'(Aleksey Balabanov)

Nominated:
 2007 - Gijón International Film Festival: Grand Prix Asturias (Aleksey Balabanov])
 2007 - Sochi Open Russian Film Festival: Grand Prize of the Festival (Aleksey Balabanov)
 2007 - Russian Guild of Film Critics Awards: Best Film

References

External links
 
  
 Review in The New York Times
 Review in The Atlantic Monthly
 Review in Variety
 Review by KinoKultura
 Review by Rusfilm
 Reviews of Russian critics  
 Interview with author in Novaya Gazeta 
 Discussion at Echo of Moscow 
 Review of Cargo 200 in Telluride Festival's Film Watch (2007)

2007 films
Films directed by Aleksei Balabanov
2000s war drama films
Films about capital punishment
Films about rape
Films set in Russia
Films set in the Soviet Union
Films set in 1984
Films shot in Russia
2007 crime thriller films
Russian crime thriller films
Soviet–Afghan War films
Russian war drama films
2007 drama films